Hannah Elizabeth Kerr (born January 6, 1997) is an American Christian musician, who plays a Christian pop style contemporary worship music. She released I Stand Here, on M2T (Made to Thrive) Records, in 2015, a record label founded by Mark Hall of Casting Crowns. The single, "I Stand Here", placed on the Billboard magazine Christian Airplay chart.

Early and personal life
Hannah Elizabeth Kerr was born on January 6, 1997, in Buffalo, New York, the daughter of Gordon and Kimberly Kerr (née, Vogan), whose father is the CEO of Black River Entertainment. She relocated to Nashville, Tennessee, during the summer before her first year in high school commenced.

Music career

2015–2016: Career Beginnings
She started her music recording career in 2015, with the extended play, I Stand Here, that was released on October 16, 2015, by M2T (Made to Thrive) Records, a division of Black River Entertainment, a record label founded by Casting Crowns front man Mark Hall. Her debut single, "I Stand Here", charted on the Billboard magazine Christian Airplay chart at No. 49. It later rose to No. 47, its peak.

2016–present: Overflow
On September 24, 2016, Hannah Kerr released her debut studio album, Overflow. The second single off the album, Undivided, became her second charting song on the Christian Airplay chart, peaking at No. 41. Kerr released a cover of Judy Garland's Have Yourself a Merry Little Christmas on November 4, 2016. The song debuted on the Hot Christian Songs chart at Number 40, becoming her first entry on the chart. It also peaked at No. 15 on the Christian Airplay chart, her highest charting single on that chart, so far. "Radiate" was chosen as the third single from Overflow. The song peaked at No. 35 on the Hot Christian Songs chart and No. 27 on the Christian Airplay chart, respectively. On August 7, 2017, "Warrior" was released as the fourth single from Overflow, along with a lyric video. Kerr performed the song live, being released to her YouTube channel. The song peaked at No. 20 on the Hot Christian Songs chart.

Discography

Studio albums

Extended plays

Singles 

*"Split The Sea (Pop Mix)" is on Listen More (EP)

Other charted songs

References

External links
 Official website

1997 births
Living people
American performers of Christian music
Musicians from New York (state)
Musicians from Nashville, Tennessee
Songwriters from New York (state)
Songwriters from Tennessee